Butibori is the Municipal council in district of Nagpur, Maharashtra.

History
Butibori is a Municipal Council city in district of Nagpur, Maharashtra.

Municipal Council election

Electoral performance 2019

References 
5. Butibori First Update Portal aamchibutiborinews
Municipal councils in Maharashtra